Samuel Curtis Johnson (December 24, 1833December 6, 1919) was an American businessman. He was the founder of S. C. Johnson & Son, Inc., of Racine, Wisconsin.

Life

Samuel Curtis Johnson, Sr., was the son of Phineas Miller Johnson and Orra Ann Collins. Johnson had deep New England roots; his great grandfather Henry Johnson married Abigail Hubbard, a great granddaughter of Rev. George Phillips, one of the founders of Watertown, Massachusetts. Johnson's immigrant ancestor Henry Johnson arrived in the Connecticut Valley from England in 1626.

In 1882, Johnson moved to Racine where he became a parquet flooring salesman for the Racine Hardware Manufacturing Co. In 1886, he purchased the flooring business from the company and renamed it Johnson's Prepared Paste Wax Company. A few years later he established his own factory for manufacturing floor waxes and wood finishes. When his son, Herbert Fisk Johnson, Sr., became a partner in 1906, the firm was renamed S. C. Johnson & Son.

Legacy

The S. C. Johnson Company remains privately held by the Johnson family today.  It operates in more than 70 countries, employs 12,000 people, and provides products in more than 110 countries around the world. The Samuel Curtis Johnson Graduate School of Management at Cornell University in Ithaca, New York, is named in his honor.

See also
Samuel Curtis Johnson Graduate School of Management

Notes

1833 births
1919 deaths
People from Elyria, Ohio
Businesspeople from Racine, Wisconsin
Samuel Curtis Johnson family
Phillips family (New England)